John Monroe Moody (February 16, 1822 – 27 January 1884) was a member of the Utah Territorial Legislature beginning in 1859 and later along with his immediate family one of the original settlers of Thatcher, Arizona.

Moody represented Salt Lake City in the territorial legislature from 1859 to 1861.  In 1861 he moved to Washington County, Utah and settled in Pine Valley, Utah.

Moody was the bishop of the Thatcher Ward of the Church of Jesus Christ of Latter-day Saints from the organization of the ward in May 1883 until his death the following January.

Notes

References 
 Andrew Jenson. Encyclopedic History of the Church. (Salt Lake City: Deseret News Press, 1941) p. 870.
 Utah State archive listings of Territorial legislature through 1860

1822 births
1884 deaths
American leaders of the Church of Jesus Christ of Latter-day Saints
Members of the Utah Territorial Legislature
19th-century American politicians
People from Thatcher, Arizona
Latter Day Saints from Utah
People from Washington County, Utah